is a TV station in Sapporo, Hokkaidō, Japan.  It is affiliated with All-Nippon News Network (ANN) and TV Asahi Network.

History

Head office: Sapporo Sosei Square, 1-chōme-6, Kita 1 Jōnishi, Chuō-ku, Sapporo, Japan
Date and year founded: December 1, 1967
Date and year started broadcasting: November 3, 1968
Callsign for analog television broadcasting: JOHH-TV
Callsign for digital television broadcasting: JOHH-DTV
Mascot: →

Stations

Analog Stations (as of July 24, 2011 end date)
Sapporo - Channel 35
Asahikawa - Channel 39
Hakodate - Channel 35
Muroran - Channel 39
Obihiro - Channel 34
Abashiri - Channel 35
Kitami - Channel 61
Kushiro - Channel 39

Analog shutdown controversy
On July 24, 2011, this station gained local attention when it played the song Time to Say Goodbye repeatedly after analog broadcasts ended at noon. The MIC usually blocks vocal music to be played on most stations' analog shutdown warnings.

Digital Stations
Button: 6
Sapporo - Channel 23
Asahikawa - Channel 14
Hakodate - Channel 23
Muroran - Channel 20
Obihiro - Channel 23
Abashiri - Channel 20
Kitami - Channel 31
Kushiro - Channel 36

Programs
AKB0048 (formerly)

Rival stations
Hokkaido Broadcasting Co., Ltd. (HBC)
the Sapporo Television Broadcasting Co., Ltd. (STV)
Hokkaido Cultural Broadcasting Co., Ltd. (uhb)
TV Hokkaido Co., Ltd. (TVh)

External links
the official website of HTB in Japanese
HTB corporate profile in English

All-Nippon News Network
Television stations in Japan
Television channels and stations established in 1968
Toyohira-ku, Sapporo
Mass media in Sapporo